Discovery Sound or Pinochet Strait is an east-west trending channel  wide, between Guepratte Island and Briggs Peninsula, on the northeast side of Anvers Island, in the Palmer Archipelago. The channel was discovered by a German expedition under Eduard Dallmann, 1873–74, and in 1903–05 was charted by the French Antarctic Expedition under Jean-Baptiste Charcot. During 1927 it was explored by Discovery Investigations personnel on the Discovery who applied the name.

References 

Straits of the Palmer Archipelago